Jim Connock (5 June 1925 – 29 June 1991) was an English film editor.

Selected filmography
 Salute the Toff (1952)
 Hammer the Toff (1952)
 Paul Temple Returns (1952)
 Before I Wake (1955)
 The Man in the Road (1956)
 The Surgeon's Knife (1957)
 The Diplomatic Corpse (1958)
 The House in Marsh Road (1960)
 Jackpot (1960)
 Freedom to Die (1961)
 Ticket to Paradise (1961)
 Follow That Man (1961)
 Dead Man's Evidence (1962)
 Gaolbreak (1962)
 Emergency (1962)
 Night of the Prowler (1962)
 Danger by My Side (1962)
 The Marked One (1963)
 Slaughter High (1986)

References

External links
 

1925 births
1991 deaths
English film editors
Film people from London